Percy Hague Jowett (1882–1955) was a British artist and arts administrator, principal of the Royal College of Art.

Jowett was born in Halifax, Yorkshire in 1882. He studied art at Leeds College of Art and London's Royal College of Art.

In 1927, he became head of Chelsea School of Art, and in 1935, principal of the Royal College of Art, succeeding William Rothenstein, and went on to give the sculptor Henry Moore his first job. During World War II, Jowett served as a committee member with the War Artists' Advisory Committee. He retired from the RCA in 1948.

Personal life
Jowett married Enid Ledward, sister of the sculptor, Gilbert Ledward.

References

External links

1882 births
1955 deaths
British artists
British arts administrators
People associated with the Royal College of Art
Alumni of Leeds Arts University
Alumni of the Royal College of Art
People from Halifax, West Yorkshire